African Invertebrates is a peer-reviewed open access scientific journal that covers the taxonomy, systematics, biogeography, ecology, conservation, and palaeontology of Afrotropical invertebrates, whether terrestrial, freshwater, or marine. It is published by Pensoft Publishers on behalf of the KwaZulu-Natal Museum and the editor-in-chief is David G. Herbert (KwaZulu-Natal Museum).

History
The journal was established in 1906 as the Annals of the Natal Government Museum and after 1910 renamed to Annals of the Natal Museum. In 1989, the journal stopped publishing archaeological and anthropological papers, which was split of to a new journal, the Natal Museum Journal of Humanities (later: Southern African Humanities), while the  Annals of the Natal Museum were restricted to the natural sciences. The journal obtained its name in 2001 when its scope was limited to the study of invertebrates.

Abstracting and indexing 
The journal is abstracted and indexed in:

According to the Journal Citation Reports, the journal has a 2016 impact factor of 0.622.

See also
List of zoology journals

References

External links

African Invertebrates on Sabinet
Annals of the Natal Museum in Biodiversity Heritage Library
 African Invertebrates in ZooBank

Entomology journals and magazines
Paleontology journals
Publications established in 1906
Biannual journals
English-language journals
Pensoft Publishers academic journals
Creative Commons Attribution-licensed journals
Systematics journals
1906 establishments in the Colony of Natal